Miguel Rábago (born 19 December 1941) is a Mexican sailor. He competed in the Flying Dutchman event at the 1972 Summer Olympics.

References

External links
 

1941 births
Living people
Mexican male sailors (sport)
Olympic sailors of Mexico
Sailors at the 1972 Summer Olympics – Flying Dutchman
Place of birth missing (living people)